Eskipazar is a town and district of Karabük Province in the Black Sea region of Turkey. According to the 2000 census, the population of the district was 16,365, of whom 8,457 lived in the town of Eskipazar. It separated from Çerkeş district to become a district in its own right in 1945. It was a district in Çankırı Province until 1995. The Ankara-Zonguldak railway passes through the district.

History 

The city was founded about 1300 BC by the Hittites. It became part of the Roman Empire in the 1st century BC, and its name was changed to Hadrianopolis, better known as Hadrianopolis in Paphlagonia, in the 2nd century AD.

The city was captured by Emir Karatekin, along with Çankırı, and named Viranşehir. The name was changed to Eskipazar during the Second Constitutional Era.

In 2018, during archaeological excavations discovered one of the earliest churches in Anatolia. According to a member of Karabük University's archaeology department it dates back to the mid-5th century.

Notes

References

External links
 District governor's official website 
 District municipality's official website 
 Brief information on Eskipazar 

Populated places in Karabük Province
Districts of Karabük Province